Chaleh Chaleh may refer to:

Chaleh Chaleh, Ilam
Chaleh Chaleh, Lorestan